Hicetas ( or ; c. 400 – c. 335 BC) was a Greek philosopher of the Pythagorean School. He was born in Syracuse. Like his fellow Pythagorean Ecphantus and the Academic Heraclides Ponticus, he believed that the daily movement of permanent stars was caused by the rotation of the Earth around its axis. When Copernicus referred to Nicetus Syracusanus (Nicetus of Syracuse) in De revolutionibus orbium coelestium as having been cited by Cicero as an ancient who also argued that the Earth moved, it is believed that he was actually referring to Hicetas.

Cicero refers to Hicetas in the Academica, volume II, citing in turn Theophrastus.  According to Heath:
Cicero [says] “Hicetas of Syracuse, as Theophrastus says, holds that the heaven, the sun, the moon, the stars and in fact all things in the sky remain still, and nothing else in the universe moves, except the earth; but as the earth turns and twists about its axis with extreme swiftness, all the same results follow as if the earth were still and the heaven moved". This is of course not well expressed…but Cicero means no more than that the rotation of the earth is a complete substitute for the apparent daily rotation of the heaven as a whole.

Notes

4th-century BC Syracusans
4th-century BC philosophers
Ancient Greek astronomers
Pythagoreans of Magna Graecia
400s BC births
330s BC deaths